The following is a list of notable people who were born or who live or formerly lived in the city of Boca Raton, Florida.

Reed Alexander, actor
Eric André, comedian
Jozy Altidore, association football player
Carling Bassett-Seguso with husband Robert Seguso, both tennis players
Alfred F. Beiter, former US Congressman
Vitor Belfort, former UFC Light Heavyweight Champion, current UFC fighter
Derek Bell, motor racing driver
Sean Berdy, actor
Yuniesky Betancourt, baseball player
Yvenson Bernard, football player
Jeanne Bice, founder of Quacker Factory
Ian Bishop, former English association football player
Ryland Blackinton, musician/guitarist for Cobra Starship
Jon Bon Jovi, singer & musician
Jason Bonham, rock and roll drummer & son of Led Zeppelin drummer John Bonham
Boots, musician and record producer
Ernest Borgnine, actor
Don Brewer, drummer for Grand Funk Railroad
Rebecca Brooke, actress
Keith Byars, former football player
Daniel Cane, co-founder of Blackboard, Inc. and Modernizing Medicine
Jennifer Capriati, tennis player
Chris Carrabba, lead singer & guitarist of Dashboard Confessional
Cris Carter, All-Pro football player
Ethan Carter III, professional wrestler (billed as from Boca Raton, Florida)
Noah Centineo, actor
Jakob Chychrun (born 1998), hockey player for the Arizona Coyotes
Jeff Crowe, former New Zealand cricketer
Elena Dementieva, Russian tennis player
Dion DiMucci, Rock and Roll Hall of Fame member
Don Drumm, country singer
Wayne Dyer, author
Rashad Evans, former UFC Lightheavyweight Champion, current UFC fighter
Chris Evert, 18-time grand slam tennis player
Dr. Frank Field, TV personality, and NYC meteorologist for 5 decades
Mark Gilbert, Major League Baseball player, and US Ambassador to New Zealand and Samoa
Jeff Gordon, NASCAR racer
Steffi Graf, tennis player
Ariana Grande, singer, songwriter, and actress
Frankie Grande, stage actor, producer, TV host, YouTube personality, dancer and singer
Taurean Green, basketball player
John Grogan, author of Marley & Me
Sébastien Grosjean, French tennis player
Megan Hauserman, reality show star and contestant
John W. Henry, one of the owners of the Boston Red Sox
Scott Hirsch, boxing manager & former e-mail spammer
Ryan Hunter-Reay, IndyCar Series driver
Žydrūnas Ilgauskas, basketball player
Khori Ivy, former football player
Greg Joseph (born 1994), football placekicker for the Minnesota Vikings of the National Football League
Don King, boxing promoter
Don Kirshner, music publisher, rock music producer, talent manager, and songwriter.
Kira Kosarin, actress, singer
Dennis Kozlowski, former CEO of Tyco International
 Byron Krieger (1920-2015), foil, sabre, and épée fencer; NCAA champion; two-time Pan Am gold medalist; two-time Olympian; two-time Maccabiah Games gold medalist
Bernhard Langer, golfer
Allison Lefcort, artist
Jesse Levine (born 1987), American-Canadian tennis player
Scott Levine, computer criminal
DeDe Lind, glamour model
Hector Lombard, former Bellator Middleweight Champion, current UFC fighter
 Ruth Madoff (born 1941), wife of Bernie Madoff
 Mathew Martoma (born 1974 as Ajai Mathew Mariamdani Thomas), hedge fund portfolio manager, convicted of insider trading
Marilyn Manson, shock rocker
Leonard Marshall, football player
Tucker Max, writer
Nicko McBrain, Iron Maiden drummer
Vince McMahon, professional wrestler & promoter
Scott Mersereau, professional football player for the New York Jets
Andy Mill, Olympic ski racer and ex-husband of Chris Evert
Corina Morariu, tennis player
Jaclyn Nesheiwat, beauty queen, fashion model
Paul Newman, entrepreneur
Greg Norman, golfer
Petter Northug, Norwegian cross-country skier
Tristan Nunez, professional racecar driver
Terry Pegula, billionaire natural gas tycoon and owner of the Buffalo Sabres & the Buffalo Bills
Sabby Piscitelli, football player for the Tampa Bay Buccaneers
Danny Porush, entrepreneur, investment banker
Maury Povich and wife, Connie Chung, tabloid and news media personalities
Morgan Pressel, golfer
Guillaume Raoux, tennis player
Mark Richt, head football coach of the University of Miami 
Andy Roddick, tennis player
Pete Rose, baseball player
Frank Rosenthal, ex-Las Vegas casino owner & handicapper
Marion Ryan, 1950s British singer
Adin Ross (born 2000), twitch streamer
Sheryl Sandberg, COO of Facebook
Logan Sargeant, Formula 2 racing driver
Ryan Shore, Grammy & Emmy nominated composer
Vince Spadea (born 1974), tennis player
Scott Stapp, lead singer for the rock band Creed
Howard Stelzer, avant-garde composer & founder of Intransitive Recordings
Anna Tatishvili, tennis player
Horia Tecău, tennis player
Sahaj Ticotin, lead singer for the rock band Ra
David Schneider (born 1955), South African-Israeli tennis player

Gregory Tony (Class of 1997), Sheriff of Broward County, Florida
Donald Trump, real estate mogul and 45th President of the United States, has a second residence in Boca Raton
Jeff Tuel, Jacksonville Jaguars quarterback
Danny Valencia (born 1984), Major League and Team Israel baseball player
 Alan Veingrad (born 1963), NFL football player
Brian Voss, bowler
Blair Walsh, All-Pro football kicker for the Minnesota Vikings
Sean White, starting QB for Auburn Tigers
Ernie Wise, UK comedian & half of the double act Morecambe and Wise, had a holiday home here, where he spent much of his time after Morecambe's death in 1984.

References

Boca Raton